Weekly Eleven is a weekly newspaper published in Myanmar (Burma). It is one of the five weekly journals published by Eleven Media Group which was founded in June 2000. It is focused on general local news and some sports and international news. It won the "Media of the Year" award in 2011 from Reporters Without Borders, for standing up to the junta and "using extraordinary ingenuity to slip through the censorship net and inform the public".

A Memorandum of Understanding (MoU) was signed in Yangon on 4 May 2012 by Nation Multimedia Group chairman Suthichai Yoon and Eleven Media Group chairman and CEO Dr Than Htut Aung to form a joint venture in a wide range of English-language publications.

See also 
 List of newspapers in Myanmar

References

External links 
 Official website of Eleven Media Group

Weekly newspapers published in Myanmar